Laodong Lu station or Laodong Road station may refer to:

 Laodong Lu station (Suzhou Rail Transit)
 Laodong Lu station (Xi'an Metro)